The Nelson Maple Leafs were a senior men's ice hockey team. They won the British Columbia Senior Championship, the Savage Cup, seven times (1937, 1961, 1965, 1967, 1971, 1986, and 1987). They played in, but lost, the 1965 Allan Cup Final.

The Maple Leafs played in the West Kootenay League from 1932-33 through 1940-41 and in 1945-46. They played in the Western International Hockey League from 1946-47 through 1986-87.

Nelson Maple Leafs who played in the NHL

 Lloyd Ailsby
 Dale Anderson
 Joe Bell
 George Boothman
 Al "Red" Carr
 Ed Cooper
 Denis Dupéré
 Pat Egan
 Dave Gatherum
 John Harms
 Ed Hatoum - later as head coach
 Fred Hergerts
 Ron Homenuke
 Vic Howe
 Buck Jones
 Brad Larsen
 Mike Laughton
 Bryan Lefley
 Norman "Odie" Lowe
 Connie Madigan
 Jack Mann
 Seth Martin
 Rudy Pilous
 Chuck Rayner
 Garth Rizzuto
 Cliff Schmautz
 Glen Smith
 Spence Tatchell
 Sergei Varlamov
 Pete Vipond
 Eddie Wares

References

Defunct ice hockey teams in Canada
Ice hockey teams in British Columbia
West Kootenay League
Senior ice hockey teams
Ice hockey clubs established in 1932
Western International Hockey League teams